H. A. Meldrum Company Building is a historic department store building located at Buffalo in Erie County, New York. It was built about 1909 and is an eight-story, reinforced concrete commercial building with brick veneer walls.  It was built as an addition to the Meldrum department store located at 460-470 Main Street. The H. A. Meldrum Company operated from 1897 to 1922.  Its founder, Herbert Alexander Meldrum (1870-1960), was the son of Alexander Meldrum one of the founders of AM&A's.

It was listed on the National Register of Historic Places in 2014.

Gallery

References

Commercial buildings on the National Register of Historic Places in New York (state)
Commercial buildings completed in 1909
Buildings and structures in Buffalo, New York
National Register of Historic Places in Buffalo, New York